Charles of Norway  may refer to:

 Charles I of Norway (1409–1470), King of Sweden and Norway
 Charles II of Norway (1748–1818), King of Sweden and Norway
 Charles III of Norway (1763–1844), King of Sweden and Norway
 Charles IV of Norway (1826–1872), King of Sweden and Norway